Inspector Harold Francis Callahan (born October 24, 1928), nicknamed Dirty Harry, is a fictional character and protagonist of the Dirty Harry film series, which consists of Dirty Harry (1971), Magnum Force (1973), The Enforcer (1976), Sudden Impact (1983), and The Dead Pool (1988). Callahan is portrayed by Clint Eastwood in each film.

From his debut, Callahan became the template for a new kind of film cop: an antihero who does not hesitate to cross professional boundaries in pursuit of his own vision of justice, especially when the law is poorly served by an inept, incompetent bureaucracy.

All of the Dirty Harry films feature Callahan killing criminals, mostly in gunfights. Phrases he utters in armed stand-offs, "Go ahead, make my day" and "[...] you've got to ask yourself one question: 'Do I feel lucky?' Well, do ya, punk?" have become iconic. As the 1971 film was criticized for carrying "authoritarian" undertones, the sequels attempted to be more balanced by pitting Harry against villains from a broader ideological spectrum, notably in 1973's Magnum Force, in which Harry is shown fighting vigilantism after it goes too far.

Biography
Callahan is an Inspector with the San Francisco Police Department, usually with the Homicide Division, although for disciplinary or political reasons he is occasionally transferred to other less prominent units, such as the Personnel Division (in The Enforcer)  or Stakeout (in Magnum Force) or just sent out of town on mundane research assignments (in Sudden Impact). Callahan's primary concern is protecting and avenging the victims of violent crime. Though proficient at apprehending criminals, his methods are often unconventional; while some claim that he is prepared to ignore the law and professional and ethical boundaries, regarding them as needless red tape hampering justice, his methods are usually within the law – he takes advantage of situations that justify his use of deadly force.  

When a group of men holding hostages in a liquor store in The Enforcer demand a getaway car, Callahan delivers one by driving the car through the store's plate glass window and then shooting the robbers. Rather than following the rules of the police department, Callahan inserts himself into the scene of the event at a time when the imminent use of deadly force by the criminals justifies his use of deadly force against the criminals. 

Conversely, in Sudden Impact when he finds out that Jennifer Spencer (Sondra Locke), the person responsible for a series of murders in San Francisco and São Paulo, was a rape victim killing her unpunished rapists, he lets her go free, indicating that he feels her retribution was justified. In The Dead Pool, Callahan shoots a fleeing and unarmed Mafia assassin in the back and kills the villain in the end with a harpoon knowing that the man's pistol is out of ammunition.

Callahan goes a step further in Dirty Harry, in which he shoots serial killer Charles "Scorpio" Davis after Davis surrenders and put his hands in the air. Determined to know the location of a 14-year-old girl that Davis has kidnapped and buried alive, Callahan then presses his foot onto Davis' leg wound, ignoring Davis's pleas for a doctor and a lawyer until Davis gives up the location of the kidnapped girl. Callahan is later informed by the District Attorney that because Callahan kicked in the door of Davis's residence without a warrant, and because Davis's confession of the girl's location was made under the duress of torture, the evidence against him is inadmissible, and Davis has been released without charges filed against him. Callahan explains his outlook to the mayor, who asks how Callahan ascertains that a man he had shot was intending to commit rape; the inspector responds, "When a naked man is chasing a woman through an alley with a butcher knife and a hard-on, I figure he isn't out collecting for the Red Cross."

While his partners and many other officers respect and admire Callahan, others see him as unfit to serve on the police force. He often clashes with superiors who dislike his methods, and judges and prosecutors are wary of handling his cases because of frequent violations of the Fourth Amendment and other irregularities. A police commissioner admits that Callahan's "unconventional methods ... get results", but adds that his successes are "more costly to the city and this department in terms of publicity and physical destruction than most other men's failures". (The publicity makes him well known; in Sudden Impact, the police chief of another city calls him "the famous Harry Callahan", and by The Dead Pool he is so well known that the department wants to transfer him to Public Relations, even while he destroys three police cars in one month and causes a TV station to sue the department.) Callahan is often reprimanded, suspended, and demoted to minor units. At the start of Magnum Force Lt. Briggs transfers him to Stakeout. In The Enforcer, Captain McKay assigns him to Personnel. In Sudden Impact he is threatened with a transfer to Traffic and being fired, in The Enforcer he begins a 180-day suspension imposed by McKay, and in The Dead Pool he is only allowed to stay off desk duty with a new partner. According to film critic Roger Ebert, "it would take an hour in each of these movies to explain why he's not in jail".

The films routinely depict Callahan as being a skilled marksman and strong hand-to-hand combatant, killing at least one man with his bare hands. He is a multiple winner of the SFPD's pistol championship. In the five films, Callahan is shown killing a combined total of 43 criminals, mostly with his trademark revolver, a Smith & Wesson Model 29 .44 Magnum, which he describes as "the most powerful handgun in the world". He refuses to join the secret police death squad in Magnum Force, as he prefers the present system, despite its flaws, to the vigilante alternative. In his fight against criminals, however, including the fellow officers on the death squad, Callahan is relentless and shows no hesitation if he has to use ultimate force.

In Dirty Harry, several explanations are suggested for his nickname. When his partner Chico Gonzalez asks about the nickname's origins, Frank DiGiorgio says, facetiously, that "that's one thing about our Harry; [he] doesn't play any favorites. Harry hates everybody: limeys, micks, hebes, fat dagos, niggers, honkies, chinks - you name it." After being called to talk down a jumper, Callahan claims he is known as "Dirty Harry" because he is assigned to "every dirty job that comes along". When Harry is ordered to deliver ransom money to Scorpio, Gonzalez opines "no wonder they call him Dirty Harry; [he] always gets the shit end of the stick". In Dirty Harry, Gonzalez humorously suggests that Callahan's nickname may have an alternate origin given that he twice ends up peeking through a naked woman's window and later follows a suspect into a strip club.

The films reveal little about Callahan's personal background. In the first film, Callahan tells Chico Gonzalez's wife that his wife was killed by a drunk driver. She appears in Magnum Force in an old photograph which Harry turns around. The doctor tending to him after the first film's bank robbery intimates that "us Potrero Hill boys gotta stick together". The first film's novelization explains that Callahan grew up in this neighborhood and describes a hostile relationship between the police and the residents. Callahan recalls once throwing a brick at a police officer, who picked it up and threw it back. The following sequels show that Harry lives within the city limits in a small studio apartment on Jackson Street in the Nob Hill area, so unfamiliar with his neighbors that they refer to him only as "the cop who lives upstairs". Also Harry Callahan served in the Marines and, possibly, he is a Korean war veteran. In Magnum Force Harry's friend Charlie McCoy says "We should have done our 20 in the Marines", indicating that they served (or could/should have served) together in the armed forces. In The Dead Pool, a coffee mug on Harry's desk at the police station bears the United States Marine Corps seal and in The Enforcer it is clear he has already been checked out on the LAWS rocket, a USMC weapon. 

His hobbies appear to consist of target shooting and playing pool (which we see him doing in The Enforcer). He appears to subsist on a diet of hot dogs, hamburgers and strong black coffee which he takes without sugar and is so unchanging that he simply orders 'The usual' from the staff of his regular eateries (in The Dead Pool he samples his girlfriend's unknown dessert but does not have one himself). He drinks beer, and on one occasion apple juice, and both runs and weightlifts in the gym. In Sudden Impact he acquires a pet bulldog called 'Meathead' but there is no sign of him in The Dead Pool.

Callahan uses different pairs of sunglasses throughout the series. His sunglasses in Magnum Force are the Ray-Ban Balorama.  In The Enforcer, he uses Ray-Ban B&L Aviator Style A. In Sudden Impact, he wears Gargoyles ANSI sunglasses.

Partners
When Al Quan becomes Callahan's partner in The Dead Pool, the inspector respects Quan's experience but does not want to work with anyone because, he says, "most of my partners end up in the hospital or dead"; he also warns Quan to "get a bulletproof vest", which ends up saving Quan in an explosion. It is a recurring theme in the Dirty Harry films that Callahan has a high turnover of partners; most are killed or wounded while working with him. In Dirty Harry, he mentions two unseen partners named Fanducci and Dietrich; Dietrich is in the hospital having been shot, while Fanducci is dead (in The Enforcer, reference is made to the fact that Fanducci was killed in 1968).  His partner in Dirty Harry, Chico Gonzalez, survives being shot by Scorpio and later retires (in Magnum Force, Harry remarks that Gonzalez became a college teacher after leaving the police force). His partner in Magnum Force, Earlington "Early" Smith is killed by a bomb planted in his mailbox. In The Enforcer, Kate Moore is killed by terrorists while saving Callahan's life. She had previously mentioned Fanducci and Smith's names to Harry, to demonstrate that she is aware of the risks of being his partner. Occasional Callahan partner Frank DiGiorgio is also killed, albeit whilst working with another officer. Of all Callahan's partners seen on screen, Quan and Gonzalez are the only two to survive. Gonzalez saves Callahan's life by shooting at Scorpio right before Scorpio was about to shoot Callahan. Callahan's partner in Sudden Impact played by Albert Popwell also played a bank robber in Dirty Harry, a community activist in The Enforcer, and a pimp in Magnum Force.

Another theme explored in several movies is Callahan being assigned a partner he would instinctively resent being paired with: Gonzalez because he is a rookie college graduate, and Moore because she is a woman in total lack of field experience. However, they eventually earn his respect and both go on to save Harry's life.

Relationships
In Dirty Harry we learn that Callahan's unnamed wife has recently died, her picture still on display in his apartment. In Magnum Force he begins a relationship with Sunny, an Asian woman who is one of his neighbors and asks to go to bed with him on their first meeting. In Sudden Impact he establishes a sexual relationship with vigilante Jennifer Spencer although it is uncertain if this goes any further, with Spencer commenting 'Neither of us want to be alone tonight'. The Dead Pool implies a romantic relationship with news reporter Samantha Walker, and the film ends with her and Callahan walking away together.

Cultural recognition
Callahan is considered a film icon, so much so that his nickname, "Dirty Harry", has entered the lexicon as slang for ruthless police officers. Harry Callahan was voted number 23 by Empire Magazine on their list of The 100 Greatest Movie Characters. Callahan was voted the 17th greatest movie hero on 100 Years... 100 Heroes and Villains. He was also named one of The 20 All Time Coolest Heroes in Pop Culture by Entertainment Weekly. He was also ranked 42nd by Premiere magazine on their list of the 100 Greatest Movie Characters of All Time. The character also received recognition from the American Film Institute. Callahan's trademark weapon, the Smith & Wesson Model 29 .44 Magnum revolver, was named the second greatest movie weapon of all time, behind the lightsaber from Star Wars.

On AFI's 100 Years... 100 Movie Quotes, two of Dirty Harry's famous lines ranked 6th and 51st, respectively: 

The former phrase was borrowed by US President Ronald Reagan in a March 1985 speech to the American Business Conference. Promising to veto any proposed tax rises, he challenged those who wanted them to: "Go ahead, make my day." It has also given its name to a law in Colorado, the Make My Day Law, which protects homeowners who use lethal force against intruders.

See also
 Dirty Harry (film series)
 Dirty Harry (NES Game)

References

Dirty Harry
Fictional characters based on real people
Fictional characters from San Francisco
Fictional gunfighters in films
Fictional Irish American people
Fictional mass murderers
Fictional people from the 20th-century
Fictional police officers in films
Fictional San Francisco Police Department detectives
Fictional United States Marine Corps personnel
Fictional vigilantes
Film characters introduced in 1971
Thriller film characters